Bras-Panon is a commune in the department and region of Réunion, France. It borders the communes of Saint-André, Saint-Benoît and Salazie; as well as the Mât river, the Rivière des Roches and the Indian Ocean.

The commune is a large producer of vanilla, and holds the largest Agricultural Show on the island, every May.

Geography

Climate

Bras-Panon has a tropical rainforest climate (Köppen climate classification Af).

Population

See also
Communes of the Réunion department

References

External links

 Site of the CIREST
 official site

Communes of Réunion